Joseph Whidbey FRS (1757 – 9 October 1833) was a member of the Royal Navy who served on the Vancouver Expedition 1791–95, and later achieved renown as a naval engineer. He is notable for having been the first European to discover and chart Admiralty Island in the Alexander Archipelago in 1794.

Little is recorded of Whidbey's life before his warranting as a sailing master in 1779.

Europa paid off, but Whidbey soon gained a berth, along with Vancouver, in the newly built .

In 1792, Whidbey accompanied Lieutenant Peter Puget in small boats to explore what was later named Puget Sound. On 2 June, the team discovered Deception Pass, establishing the insularity of the Sound's largest island, which Vancouver named Whidbey Island.

In 1799, then-Earl St Vincent commissioned him to make of feasibility survey making Tor Bay a fleet anchorage; Whidbey recommended this be done by building a great breakwater. Surviving correspondence suggests that around this time he apparently struck up a lifelong friendly and professional relationship with the engineer John Rennie.

Whidbey was appointed Master Attendant at Sheerness in 1799. In 1804 he received the prestigious appointment as Master Attendant at Woolwich, one of the Royal Navy's greatest dockyards. In 1805, Whidbey became a Fellow of the Royal Society, sponsored by a long list of distinguished men of science: Alexander Dalrymple, James Rennell, William Marsden, James Stanier Clarke, Sir Gilbert Blane, Mark Beaufoy, Joseph Huddart, and John Rennie.

In 1806, as the Napoleonic Wars impended, Whidbey joined Rennie in planning the Plymouth Breakwater, at St Vincent's request; in 1811 came the order to begin construction and Whidbey was appointed Acting Superintending Engineer. This task required great engineering, organizational and political skills, as the many strictly technical challenges were complicated by the significant resources devoted to the project, from which various parties evidenced a desire for advantage. Nearly 4,000,000 (four million) tons of stone were quarried and transported, using about a dozen ships innovatively designed by the two men.

Construction started on 8 August 1812; it was sufficiently completed by 1814 to shelter ships of the line, although work continued for over 50 years. Napoleon was reported as commenting that it was a grand thing, as he passed by it on the way to exile on St. Helena in 1815.

Whidbey continued to work on the breakwater and other engineering projects, including the breakwater's lighthouse (designed by Trinity House), until retirement around 1830. His contribution to the Royal Society includes a paper on fossils found in the Plymouth quarries 1817.

Character

Records of the Vancouver Expedition suggest that Whidbey was an expert and reliable seaman, entrusted with difficult tasks. However, upon his return to England, he provided testimony for Sir Joseph Banks' campaign against George Vancouver (Whidbey was at the time competing with Vancouver for the pay accrued as Astronomer for the voyage.) Vancouver soon died, perhaps mooting difficulties in their relationship.

At any rate, Whidbey rose swiftly from his humble beginnings, undoubtedly due to his proven technical skill as much as to his connections.

Correspondence between Whidbey and John Rennie suggests a close and honest working relationship, and an earthy sense of humour. For example, when Sir Francis Northwell pestered the two with the idea that a large hole in the floor of Plymouth bay might complicate construction, Whidbey wrote to Rennie that, should such a feature be discovered, it would be named Lady Northwell's Hole.

Legacy
It is not known that Whidbey had children. Whidbey's house near Plymouth still stands, and is called Bovisand House.

Numerous features around Whidbey Island bear the Whidbey name, such as Joseph Whidbey State Park and Whidbey Island Naval Air Station. In Britain, the Whidbey Automatic Light (Occulting Green) was constructed at the eastern end of Plymouth Sound in 1980.

In what is now South Australia, Matthew Flinders in February 1802 named the following geographical features "after my worthy friend, the former master-attendant at Sheerness" – the Whidbey Isles and Point Whidbey.

References 

Royal Navy officers
Fellows of the Royal Society
1757 births
1833 deaths
English hydrographers